Liu Yunpeng (born October 24, 1962) is a retired Chinese high jumper. He competed for his native country at the Los Angeles 1984 Olympics, where he cleared 2.29m and finished on 7th. His personal best is 2.30m, accomplished in 1989. He was one of the last elite high jumpers using the old-fashioned Straddle technique.

He is the father of model Ning Liu.

International competitions

References
sports-reference

1962 births
Living people
Chinese male high jumpers
Olympic athletes of China
Athletes (track and field) at the 1984 Summer Olympics
Asian Games medalists in athletics (track and field)
Athletes (track and field) at the 1986 Asian Games
Athletes (track and field) at the 1990 Asian Games
Asian Games silver medalists for China
Medalists at the 1986 Asian Games
Medalists at the 1990 Asian Games
20th-century Chinese people